The 2007–08 B Group was the 53rd season of the Bulgarian B Football Group, the second tier of the Bulgarian football league system. The season started on 18 August 2007 and finished on 24 May 2008 with the A Group promotion play-off between the runners-up from both divisions.

East B Group

Table

West B Group

Table

Promotion play-off

Full Program
West group program or 
East group program or

References 

Second Professional Football League (Bulgaria) seasons
2007–08 in Bulgarian football
Bulgaria